The Citizens' Party was a political party in Singapore.

History
The party was established on 25 February 1959 by Seah Peng Chuan. Seah had been elected to the Legislative Assembly in 1955 elections as a member of the Labour Front, but had left the party to sit as an independent.

In the May 1959 elections the party nominated five candidates for the 51 seats in the Assembly. However, it received only 0.6% of the vote and failed to win a seat.

The party subsequently merged into the Workers' Party on 13 September 1960.

References

Defunct political parties in Singapore
Political parties established in 1959
1959 establishments in Singapore
Political parties disestablished in 1960
1960 disestablishments in Singapore